Akpassanou is a town in east-central Ivory Coast. It is a sub-prefecture of Ouellé Department in Iffou Region, Lacs District.

Akpassanou was a commune until March 2012, when it became one of 1126 communes nationwide that were abolished.

In 2014, the population of the sub-prefecture of Akpassanou was 6,178.

Villages
The 4 villages of the sub-prefecture of Akpassanou and their population in 2014 are:
 Akpassanou (1 457)
 Doménansou (1 130)
 Foutou (1 922)
 Gbangbo-Tiémélékro (1 669)

References

Sub-prefectures of Iffou
Former communes of Ivory Coast